Lokhvytsia is a city in Poltava Oblast, central Ukraine. It is the administrative center of Lokhvytsia Raion (district), and is located on the banks of the Lokhvytsia River.  Population:

History
The name of the river Lokhvytsia, as well as the town, comes from the Old Slavonic word  lokhve which means "salmon".

At the time of Kievan Rus' the territory where the town is located was  part of Pereyaslav Principality.  The precise date of the foundation is unknown.  From written records, it can be determined that Lokhvytsia existed prior to 1320.

In 1644, Magdeburg rights were granted to the town so that all town issues were to be resolved by a city council, elected by the wealthy citizens.  In 1648–1658, Lokhvytsia was a Sotnia town of the Myrhorod Cossack Regiment, later (1658-І781 р.р.) of the Lubny Cossack Regiment.

During World War II, Lokhvytsia was occupied by the German Army from September 12, 1941 to September 12, 1943. This was the town where the pincers of 1st Panzer Army (Kleist) and 2nd Panzer Army (Guderian) linked up, encircling more than 600,000 Soviet troops east of Kyiv.

The Hlynsko-Rozbyshiv (Lokhvytsia and Hadyach districts) oil and gas deposits provide large volumes of oil and gas sufficient for the entire Poltava Oblast and beyond. Poltava oil is of high-quality: it contains up to 55 per cent of light oil and is quite low in sulphur.  The natural gas consists of almost 70% of propane-butane fractions, which make it a valuable raw material for the chemical industry, such as the production of synthetic fibres and plastics.

Gallery

References

External links
 The murder of the Jews of Lokhvytsia during World War II, at Yad Vashem website.

Cities in Poltava Oblast
Lokhvitsky Uyezd
Populated places established in 1571
Cities of district significance in Ukraine
1571 establishments in the Polish–Lithuanian Commonwealth
Holocaust locations in Ukraine